Mohamed Hashim Abdul Haleem is a Sri Lankan politician and a member of the Parliament of Sri Lanka and current Minister of Muslim Religious Affairs and Posts.

References
Parliament profile

1956 births
Living people
Samagi Jana Balawegaya politicians
United National Party politicians
Members of the 11th Parliament of Sri Lanka
Members of the 12th Parliament of Sri Lanka
Members of the 13th Parliament of Sri Lanka
Members of the 14th Parliament of Sri Lanka
Members of the 15th Parliament of Sri Lanka
Members of the 16th Parliament of Sri Lanka
Sri Lankan Muslims
Muslim religious affairs ministers of Sri Lanka
Posts ministers of Sri Lanka